Oure is a small town located on the island of Funen in south-central Denmark, in Svendborg Municipality. It is located 25 km south of Nyborg, 6 km southwest of Lundeborg and 12 km northeast of Svendborg.

References 

Cities and towns in the Region of Southern Denmark
Svendborg Municipality